Mavai-ye Sofla (also Romanized as Māvāī-ye Soflá) is a village in Dehaj Rural District, Dehaj District, Shahr-e Babak County, Kerman Province, Iran. At the 2006 census, its population was 46, in 16 families.

References 

Populated places in Shahr-e Babak County